JAM IP is a contact centre services organisation, specialising in consulting, professional services, software development, systems integration and managed services.  It trades independently within the KCOM Group of companies.  Its main office is based in Maidenhead, Berkshire, with an office in Hull, East Riding of Yorkshire.

JAM IP develops and consults on applications for IP contact centre management such as text to speech, voice authentication, self serve applications, and speech recognition.

History 
JAM IP Ltd was formed on 1 September 2004 and founded by Mark Pritchard, Adrian Mccann and John Kinghorn, following a management buyout of the Convergence Solutions Business Unit of OAO Technology Solutions Ltd.  Their aim was to transform how organisations engage with their customers.

On 18 December 2006, Kingston Communications announced it had acquired JAM IP Ltd to complement its Affiniti enterprise reselling and consultancy business.

The former JAM IP Ltd was merged with Affiniti's Contact Centre Solutions Group and OpenSOLUTIONS team in to form a new combined business: JAM IP.  This new business was launched on 1 October 2007.

The current company delivers CTI products into mission-critical environments, such as emergency call centres.

In June 2008, JAM IP announced that Chris Prophet, formerly the manager of Nortel's UK Contact Centre sales team, had joined JAM IP as its  Affiniti Channel Sales Director.

JAM IP's partners

 Cisco Advanced Technology Partner
 Nortel Gold Partner and Development Partner
 Verint Systems Strategic Partner

References

External links
 JAM IP

KCOM Group brands